John Napier of Merchiston (1 February 1550 – 4 April 1617), nicknamed Marvellous Merchiston, was a Scottish landowner known as a mathematician, physicist, and astronomer. He was the 8th Laird of Merchiston. His Latinized name was Ioannes Neper.

John Napier is best known as the discoverer of logarithms.  He also invented the so-called "Napier's bones" and made common the use of the decimal point in arithmetic and mathematics.

Napier's birthplace, Merchiston Tower in Edinburgh, is now part of the facilities of Edinburgh Napier University. There is a memorial to him at St Cuthbert's at the west side of Edinburgh.

Life
Napier's father was Sir Archibald Napier of Merchiston Castle, and his mother was Janet Bothwell, daughter of the politician and judge Francis Bothwell, and a sister of Adam Bothwell who became the Bishop of Orkney. Archibald Napier was 16 years old when John Napier was born.

There are no records of Napier's early education, but many believe that he was privately tutored during early childhood. At age 13, he was enrolled in St Salvator's College, St Andrews. Near the time of his matriculation the quality of the education provided by the university was poor, owing in part to the Reformation's causing strife between those of the old faith and the growing numbers of Protestants. There are no records showing that John Napier completed his education at St Andrews. It is believed he left Scotland to further his education in mainland Europe, following the advice given by his uncle Adam Bothwell in a letter written to John Napier's father on 5 December 1560, saying, "I pray you, sir, to send John to the schools either to France or Flanders, for he can learn no good at home". It is not known which university Napier attended in Europe, but when he returned to Scotland in 1571 he was fluent in Greek, a language that was not commonly taught in European universities at the time. There are also no records showing his enrollment in the premier universities in Paris or Geneva during this time.

In 1571, Napier, aged 21, returned to Scotland, and bought a castle at Gartness in 1574. On the death of his father in 1608, Napier and his family moved into Merchiston Castle in Edinburgh, where he resided the remainder of his life. He had a property within Edinburgh city as well on Borthwick's Close off the Royal Mile.

On 7 June 1596 Napier wrote a paper Secret inventions, profitable and necessary in these days for defence of this island. He describes two kinds of burning mirror for use against ships at a distance, a special kind of artillery shot, and a musket-proof metal chariot.

Napier died from the effects of gout at home at Merchiston Castle at the age of 67. He was buried in the kirkyard of St Giles in Edinburgh. Following the loss of the kirkyard of St Giles to build Parliament House, his remains were transferred to an underground vault on the north side of St Cuthbert's Parish Church at the west side of Edinburgh. There is also a wall monument to Napier at St Cuthbert's.

Many mathematicians at the time were acutely aware of the issues of computation and were dedicated to relieving practitioners of the calculation burden. Napier was famous for his devices to assist with these issues of computation. He invented a well-known mathematical artefact, the ingenious numbering rods more quaintly known as "Napier's bones", that offered mechanical means for facilitating computation.

In addition, Napier recognized the potential of the recent developments in mathematics, particularly those of prosthaphaeresis, decimal fractions, and symbolic index arithmetic, to tackle the issue of reducing computation. He appreciated that, for the most part, practitioners who had laborious computations generally did them in the context of trigonometry. Therefore, as well as developing the logarithmic relation, Napier set it in a trigonometric context so it would be even more relevant.

Advances in mathematics

His work, Mirifici Logarithmorum Canonis Descriptio (1614) contained fifty-seven pages of explanatory matter and ninety pages of tables listing the natural logarithms of trigonometric functions. The book also has an excellent discussion of theorems in spherical trigonometry, usually known as Napier's Rules of Circular Parts. 

Modern English translations of both Napier's books on logarithms and their description can be found on the web, as well as a discussion of Napier's bones and Promptuary (another early calculating device).

His invention of logarithms was quickly taken up at Gresham College, and prominent English mathematician Henry Briggs visited Napier in 1615. Among the matters they discussed were a re-scaling of Napier's logarithms, in which the presence of the mathematical constant now known as e (more accurately, e times a large power of 10 rounded to an integer) was a practical difficulty. Neither Napier nor Briggs actually discovered the constant e; that discovery was made decades later by Jacob Bernoulli.

Napier delegated to Briggs the computation of a revised table. The computational advance available via logarithms, the inverse of powered numbers or exponential notation, was such that it made calculations by hand much quicker. The way was opened to later scientific advances, in astronomy, dynamics, and other areas of physics.

Napier made further contributions. He improved Simon Stevin's decimal notation, introducing the period (.) as the delimiter for the fractional part. Lattice multiplication, used by Fibonacci, was made more convenient by his introduction of Napier's bones, a multiplication tool using a set of numbered rods.

Napier may have worked largely in isolation, but he had contact with Tycho Brahe who corresponded with his friend John Craig. Craig certainly announced the discovery of logarithms to Brahe in the 1590s (the name itself came later); there is a story from Anthony à Wood, perhaps not well substantiated, that Napier had a hint from Craig that Longomontanus, a follower of Brahe, was working in a similar direction.

It has been shown that Craig had notes on a method of Paul Wittich that used trigonometric identities to reduce a multiplication formula for the sine function to additions.

Theology

Napier had an interest in the Book of Revelation, from his student days at St Salvator's College, St Andrews. Under the influence of the sermons of Christopher Goodman, he developed a strongly anti-papal reading, going as far as to say that the Pope was the Antichrist in some of his writings.

Napier regarded A Plaine Discovery of the Whole Revelation of St. John (1593) as his most important work. It was written in English, unlike his other publications, in order to reach the widest audience and so that, according to Napier, "the simple of this island may be instructed". A Plaine Discovery used mathematical analysis of the Book of Revelation to attempt to predict the date of the Apocalypse. Napier identified events in chronological order which he believed were parallels to events described in the Book of Revelation believing that Revelation's structure implied that the prophecies would be fulfilled incrementally. In this work Napier dated the seventh trumpet to 1541, and predicted the end of the world would occur in either 1688 or 1700. Napier did not believe that people could know the true date of the Apocalypse, but claimed that since the Bible contained so many clues about the end, God wanted the Church to know when the end was coming.

In his dedication of the Plaine Discovery to James VI, dated 29 Jan 1594, Napier urged the king to see "that justice be done against the enemies of God's church," and counselled the King "to reform the universal enormities of his country, and first to begin at his own house, family, and court." The volume includes nine pages of Napier's English verse. It met with success at home and abroad. In 1600 Michiel Panneel produced a Dutch translation, and this reached a second edition in 1607. In 1602 the work appeared at La Rochelle in a French version, by Georges Thomson, revised by Napier, and that also went through several editions (1603, 1605, and 1607). A new edition of the English original was called for in 1611, when it was revised and corrected by the author, and enlarged by the addition of With a resolution of certain doubts, moved by some well affected brethren.; this appeared simultaneously at Edinburgh and London. The author stated that he still intended to publish a Latin edition, but it never appeared. A German translation, by Leo de Dromna, of the first part of Napier's work appeared at Gera in 1611, and of the whole by Wolfgang Meyer at Frankfurt-am-Main, in 1615. Among Napier's followers was Matthew Cotterius (Matthieu Cottière).

Interest in the occult
In addition to his mathematical and religious interests, Napier was often perceived as a magician, and is thought to have dabbled in alchemy and necromancy. It was said that he would travel about with a black spider in a small box, and that his black rooster was his familiar spirit.

Some of Napier's neighbors accused him of being a sorcerer and in league with the devil, believing that all of the time he spent in his study was being used to learn the black art. These rumors were stoked when Napier used his black rooster to catch a thief. Napier told his servants to go into a darkened room and pet the rooster, claiming the bird would crow if they were the one who stole his property. Unbeknownst to the servants, Napier had covered the rooster with soot. When the servants emerged from the room, Napier inspected their hands to find the one who had been too afraid to touch the rooster.

Another act which Napier is reported to have done, which may have seemed mystical to the locals, was when Napier removed the pigeons from his estate, since they were eating his grain. Napier caught the pigeons by strewing grain laced with alcohol throughout the field, and then capturing the pigeons once they were too drunk to fly away.

A contract still exists for a treasure hunt, made between Napier and Robert Logan of Restalrig. Napier was to search Fast Castle for treasure allegedly hidden there, wherein it is stated that Napier should "do his utmost diligence to search and seek out, and by all craft and ingine to find out the same, or make it sure that no such thing has been there." This contract was never fulfilled by Napier, and no gold was found when the Edinburgh Archaeological Field society excavated the castle between 1971 and 1986.

Influence
Among Napier's early followers were the instrument makers Edmund Gunter and John Speidell. The development of logarithms is given credit as the largest single factor in the general adoption of decimal arithmetic. The Trissotetras (1645) of Thomas Urquhart builds on Napier's work, in trigonometry.

Henry Briggs was an early adopter of the Napierian logarithm. He later computed a new table of logarithms to base 10, accurate to 14 decimal places.

Eponyms
An alternative unit to the decibel used in electrical engineering, the neper, is named after Napier, as is Edinburgh Napier University in Edinburgh, Scotland.

The crater Neper on the Moon is named after him.

In French and Portuguese, the natural logarithm is named after him (respectively, Logarithme Népérien and Logaritmos Neperianos).  In Italian, the mathematical constant e is named after him in Italian (Numero di Nepero).

Family
In 1572, Napier married 16-year-old Elizabeth, daughter of James Stirling, the 4th Laird of Keir and of Cadder. They had two children. Elizabeth died in 1579, and Napier then married Agnes Chisholm, with whom he had ten more children.

Napier's father-in-law, Sir James Chisholm of Cromlix, was one of many excommunicated by the General Assembly of the Presbyterian party following the Spanish blanks plot. Napier sat on the General Assembly that excommunicated the plotters, and petitioned the King James VI and I to enforce the punishment on the plotters, but was ultimately ignored since the King believed the ministers were acting cruelly, and was in favor of pursuing policies of more appeasement.

His half-brother (through his father's remarriage) was Alexander Napier, Lord Laurieston.

List of works
(1593) A Plaine Discovery of the Whole Revelation of St. John
(1614) Mirifici logarithmorum canonis descriptio – Edward Wright's English translation was published in 1616.
(1617) Rabdologiæ seu Numerationis per Virgulas libri duo (Google Books link)(published posthumously) Rabdology (Wikipedia)
(1619) Mirifici logarithmorum canonis constructio –written before the Descriptio, but published posthumously by his son Robert. Translated into English in 1889.
(1839) De arte logistica

See also
List of colleges and universities named after people
Location arithmetic
Napier's analogies
Napierian logarithm
Rabdology

Notes

References

Diploudis, Alexandros. Undusting Napier's Bones. Heriot-Watt University, 1997
"John Napier." Math & Mathematicians: The History of Math Discoveries around the World. 2 vols. U*X*L, 1999
John Napier The History of Computing Project
John Napier—Short biography and translation of work on logarithms
Intro to Spherical Trig. Includes discussion of The Napier circle and Napier's rules
EEBO (Early English Books Online) has electronic copies of some of his work, in facsimiles of editions of Napier's time (subscription or Athens login required)
Mirifici logarithmorum canonis descriptio Descriptio De Arte Logistica English Translation by Ian Bruce

Attribution

Further reading
 , the 1889 English translation.

External links

1550 births
1617 deaths
16th-century apocalypticists
16th-century Scottish mathematicians
16th-century Scottish writers
16th-century male writers
17th-century apocalypticists
17th-century Latin-language writers
17th-century Scottish mathematicians
17th-century Scottish writers
Alumni of the University of St Andrews
Burials at the kirkyard of St Giles
John
People associated with Edinburgh Napier University
Scientists from Edinburgh
Protestant writers
Scottish astronomers
Scottish inventors
Scottish mathematicians
Scottish physicists
Scottish Protestants
Writers from Edinburgh